The Coachella Valley fringe-toed lizard (Uma inornata) is a species of phrynosomatid lizard.

Phylogeny and evolution 
The species is most closely related to Uma notata, the Colorado Desert fringe-toed lizard. Genetic variation within the species is small, equivalent to that of one population of Uma notata. The species population is isolated from other closely related lizards.

Characteristics 
The species is well adapted to its desert habitat. It has a wedged-shaped nose which enables it to burrow through loose, fine sand. Elongated scales cover the ears to keep out blowing sand, and specialized nostrils allow it to breathe below the sand without inhaling sand particles.

Ecology and behaviour 
During breeding season, male lizards minimize time spent foraging for food to maximize time for mating. They preferentially ate readily-available flowers rather than spending time foraging. Female lizards observed an energy-maximizing feeding strategy all-year around.

Habitat and distribution
The lizard is endemic to Coachella Valley, California. The lizard is restricted to habitats with fine, windblown sand deposits in the sandy plains of the Coachella Valley, Riverside County, California. Since the 1970s, estimates of this species' habitat has decreased by about 75% due to human activities. Only a small portion of its original habitat has wind blowing in the fine sand that creates the “blowsand” habitat that it needs to survive.

Conservation status
It is listed as an endangered species in California, a threatened species in the United States, and the IUCN classifies it as endangered.

Refuge
The Coachella Valley National Wildlife Refuge, for the Coachella Valley fringe-toed lizard, is contained within the Coachella Valley Preserve, and Indio Hills Palms State Reserve, located east of Palm Springs near Palm Desert, California, in the Colorado Desert region of the Sonoran Desert.

References

External links
Official Coachella Valley National Wildlife Refuge website
Coachella Valley National Wildlife Refuge Map
Official Coachella Valley Preserve website 
 

Uma
Reptiles of the United States
Fauna of the Coachella Valley
Fauna of the Colorado Desert
Fauna of Riverside County, California
Fauna of the Sonoran Desert
Endangered fauna of California
Reptiles described in 1895
Taxa named by Edward Drinker Cope
ESA threatened species